Richard Berkeley (1579–1661) was an English politician who sat in the House of Commons  in 1614. 

Berkeley was the only son of Sir Henry Berkeley (died 1606) of Stoke Gifford and Rendcomb, Gloucestershire, and grandson of Sir Richard Berkeley (died 1604) of Stoke Gifford, whose effigy can be seen at the Gaunt's Chapel, Bristol. He matriculated at Magdalen College, Oxford on 4 February 1592 aged 12. 

In 1614, Berkeley was elected Member of Parliament for Gloucestershire. 

Berkeley supported the King in the Civil War and on 2 February 1647 he compounded and was fined at £370 on 6 February. On 11 April 1649, he was assessed at £150. On 1 August 1649, he was to be discharged on payment of £60 but, on 5 December 1651, he was ordered to pay £80 extra on old rent. Having paid it, on 30 January 1652 his assessment of £100 was discharged and sequestration was taken off his estate. Berkeley died in 1661 around the age of 83.

Family
Berkeley married Mary Roe, daughter of Robert Roe and his wife Elinor Jermy, who then married as his second wife Richard Berkeley's grandfather Sir Richard Berkeley. Richard Berkeley married secondly Jane Meriett daughter of Sir Thomas Merriatt. His son, Maurice, was later MP for Gloucestershire.

References

1579 births
1661 deaths
English MPs 1614
Richard